This is a list of films produced and distributed by Republic Pictures. Republic Pictures was an American independent film production-distribution corporation with studio facilities, operating from 1935 through 1959, and was best known for specializing in westerns, serials, and B films emphasizing mystery and action.

1930s

1940s

1950s

1980s

1990s

See also
List of film serials by studio

References

 
Lists of films by studio
American films by studio
Paramount Global-related lists